Walter Cooper may refer to:

 Walter Cooper (mayor) ( 1845 – 1941), 21st Mayor of Christchurch, New Zealand
 Walter Cooper (Queensland politician) (1888–1973), Australian politician
 Walter Cooper (New South Wales politician) (1842–1880)
 Walter Cooper (scientist) (born 1928), American scientist
 Walter Cooper (Essex cricketer), English cricketer
 Walter Cooper (South African cricketer)